The jade clubtail (Arigomphus submedianus) is a dragonfly in the family Gomphidae.
Its total length is 51 to 55mm. The jade clubtail species typically are around for the spring and summer season, from April to July. Their habitat consists of ponds, lakes, muddy environments and canals which often may help with adjusting their body temperature.

References

External links
 Arigomphus submedianus on BugGuide.Net

Gomphidae
Insects described in 1914